Northport is an unincorporated community in the town of Liberty Grove in Door County, Wisconsin, United States. It is the northern terminus of WIS 42 and location of the peninsula-side ferry dock of the Washington Island Ferry. The ferry takes freight, vehicles, and passengers across the Porte des Morts strait to Washington Island.

Gallery

References

External links
Webcam view of Northport

Unincorporated communities in Door County, Wisconsin
Piers in Wisconsin
Unincorporated communities in Wisconsin